Qabane is a community council located in the Mohale's Hoek District of Lesotho. Its population in 2006 was 6,924.

Villages
The community of Qabane includes the villages of Bareng, Ha 'Malehlakana, Ha Enerese, Ha Khate, Ha Letumanyane, Ha Masupha, Ha Moeti, Ha Mohlomo, Ha Moisa, Ha Mokoafo, Ha Molisana, Ha Montsi, Ha Mosebi, Ha Mosobe, Ha Motšoanakaba, Ha Mpolokoana, Ha Pesi, Ha Phalo, Ha Qalatsa, Ha Qoloane, Ha Ramatatiele, Ha Ramorutlho, Ha Rantaoleng, Ha Rathaha, Ha Seeiso, Ha Seilane, Ha Setofolo, Ha Shauli, Ha Tsemane, Ha Tsoane, Ha Tšosane, Ha Tumahole, Khama-Khamane, Khatleng, Khohlong (Ha Baholo), Khomong, Lekhalong, Letsoapong, Litejaneng, Litšoeneng, Makokoaneng, Maphutseng (Ha Talatala), Matateng, Matsatsaneng, Matsoeteng, Moeaneng, Mokoallong, Phula-Likhama, Phuthing, Polasi, Poriking, Qeng, Sek'hene, Sekameng, Sekitsing (Ha K'hefase), Setebatebe, Sethaleng, Shopong, Taung, Tesi, Thaba-Tšoeu and Tiping.

References

External links
 Google map of community villages

Populated places in Mohale's Hoek District